Larisa Dmitriyevna Ilchenko (born 18 November 1988) is a Russian long-distance swimmer. She has won eight world titles and a gold at the 2008 Olympics.

Biography
Ilchenko has dominated long distance swimming since her first World Championships in Dubai, 2004 where, aged just 16 won by over 30 seconds . The following year in Montreal, she had a much tougher time as the veterans pushed her under and held her up, but still won with a final sprint. This has been the pattern of all her subsequent victories, battling her way through the pack before sprinting clear at the end. She doubled up in Napoli 2006 to become both the 5 km and 10 km open water world champion. She has won both 5 km and 10 km events at all subsequent World Championships. The American magazine Swimming World named her open water swimmer of the year in 2006, 2007 and 2008.

She won the gold medal at the 2008 Beijing Olympics in the swimming 10 km, using her trademark closing kick after being behind the leaders for 9,900 meters of the 10,000-meter swim. For this and other achievements, she was awarded the Order of Friendship in 2009.

After sustaining an injury in 2009 and hypothermia at the 2010 World Open Water Swimming Championships, she de facto retired. In August 2012 she married a Russian swimmer Sergey Perunin. In September 2012 she was inducted to the International Marathon Swimming Hall of Fame. And in 2016 she was inducted to the International Swimming Hall of Fame.

International medals
She won 10 medals at the World Open Water Swimming Championships.

See also
 World Open Water Championships - Multiple medalists

References

External links
Article from the Washington Post on Larisa
Second Time Open Water Swimmer of the year
10k Seville
Beijing Olympic Preview
BBC Video of last 5 minutes of Beijing 10k
Beijing Bio

1988 births
Living people
Russian female long-distance swimmers
Olympic swimmers of Russia
Olympic gold medalists for Russia
Swimmers at the 2008 Summer Olympics
Medalists at the 2008 Summer Olympics
Sportspeople from Volgograd
World Aquatics Championships medalists in open water swimming
Olympic gold medalists in swimming